North Jutland is one of the 12 multi-member constituencies of the Folketing, the national legislature of Denmark. The constituency was established in 2007 following the public administration structural reform. It consists of the municipalities of Aalborg, Brønderslev, Frederikshavn, Hjørring, Jammerbugt, Læsø, Mariagerfjord, Morsø, Rebild, Thisted and Vesthimmerland. The constituency currently elects 15 of the 179 members of the Folketing using the open party-list proportional representation electoral system. At the 2022 general election it had 447,556 registered electors.

Electoral system
North Jutland currently elects 15 of the 179 members of the Folketing using the open party-list proportional representation electoral system. Constituency seats are allocated using the D'Hondt method. Compensatory seats are calculated based on the national vote and are allocated using the Sainte-Laguë method, initially at the provincial level and finally at the constituency level. Only parties that reach any one of three thresholds stipulated by section 77 of the Folketing (Parliamentary) Elections Act - winning at least one constituency seat; obtaining at least the Hare quota (valid votes in province/number of constituency seats in province) in two of the three provinces; or obtaining at least 2% of the national vote - compete for compensatory seats.

Election results

Summary

(Excludes compensatory seats)

Detailed

2022
Results of the 2022 general election held on 1 November 2022:

Votes per municipality:<

The following candidates were elected:
 Constituency seats - Theresa Berg Andersen (F), 4,115 votes; Lise Bech (Æ), 521 votes; Marie Bjerre (V), 14,050 votes; Kristian Bøgsted (Æ), 480 votes; Mette Frederiksen (A), 60,837 votes; Ane Halsboe-Jørgensen (A), 5,469 votes; Preben Bang Henriksen (V), 15,952 votes; Per Husted (A), 2,221 votes; Sólbjørg Jakobsen (I), 4,421 votes; Kristian Klarskov (M), 1,772 votes; Simon Kollerup (A), 9,947 votes; Bjarne Laustsen (A), 7,601 votes; Flemming Møller Mortensen (A), 6,194 votes; Rasmus Prehn (A), 1,899 votes; and Inger Støjberg (Æ), 47,211 votes.
 Compensatory seats - Kim Edberg Andersen (D), 5,218 votes; Christian Friis Bach (B), 1,489 votes; Peder Hvelplund (Ø), 2,435 votes; Per Larsen (C), 2,384 votes; Torsten Schack Pedersen (V), 6,631 votes; and Theresa Scavenius (Å), 1,081 votes.

2019
Results of the 2019 general election held on 5 June 2019:

Votes per municipality:

The following candidates were elected:
 Constituency seats - Lisbeth Bech-Nielsen (F), 2,645 votes; Marie Bjerre (V), 12,699 votes; Bent Bøgsted (O), 3,418 votes; Mette Frederiksen (A), 55,935 votes; Anne Honoré Østergaard (V), 6,651 votes; Orla Hav (A), 7,383 votes; Preben Bang Henriksen (V), 28,599 votes; Marianne Jelved (B), 2,657 votes; Simon Kollerup (A), 13,157 votes; Per Larsen (C), 3,209 votes; Karsten Lauritzen (V), 26,882 votes; Bjarne Laustsen (A), 15,407 votes; Flemming Møller Mortensen (A), 9,129 votes; Torsten Schack Pedersen (V), 11,276 votes; and Rasmus Prehn (A), 7,354 votes
 Compensatory seats - Lise Bech (O), 2,306 votes; Ane Halsboe-Jørgensen (A), 6,351 votes; Peder Hvelplund (Ø), 2,991 votes; and Susanne Zimmer (Å), 774 votes.

2015
Results of the 2015 general election held on 18 June 2015:

Votes per municipality:

The following candidates were elected:
 Constituency seats - Lise Bech (O), 12,951 votes; Bent Bøgsted (O), 21,534 votes; Stine Brix (Ø), 8,474 votes; Christina Egelund (I), 8,468 votes; Søren Gade (V), 37,804 votes; Ane Halsboe-Jørgensen (A), 12,755 votes; Orla Hav (A), 21,217 votes; Preben Bang Henriksen (V), 13,896 votes; Simon Kollerup (A), 13,839 votes; Karsten Lauritzen (V), 10,507 votes; Bjarne Laustsen (A), 26,026 votes; Morten Marinus (O), 13,021 votes; Flemming Møller Mortensen (A), 12,241 votes; Torsten Schack Pedersen (V), 7,974 votes; and Ib Poulsen (O), 7,881 votes.
 Compensatory seats - Torsten Gejl (Å), 5,945 votes; Marianne Jelved (B), 4,358 votes; Lisbeth Bech Poulsen (F), 3,992 votes; and Rasmus Prehn (A), 9,850 votes.

2011
Results of the 2011 general election held on 15 September 2011:

Votes per municipality:

The following candidates were elected:
 Constituency seats - Pernille Vigsø Bagge (F), 19,543 votes; Bent Bøgsted (O), 14,273 votes; Lene Espersen (C), 14,591 votes; Orla Hav (A), 29,286 votes; Preben Bang Henriksen (V), 12,681 votes; Marianne Jelved (B), 12,479 votes; Morten Marinus Jørgensen (O), 6,798 votes; Birgitte Josefsen (V), 11,582 votes; Simon Kollerup (A), 13,145 votes; Karsten Lauritzen (V), 26,045 votes; Bjarne Laustsen (A), 28,873 votes; Flemming Møller Mortensen (A), 10,624 votes; Tina Nedergaard (V), 15,264 votes; Torsten Schack Pedersen (V), 13,867 votes; and Rasmus Prehn (A), 9,690 votes.
 Compensatory seats - Stine Maiken Brix (Ø), 4,873 votes; Thyra Frank (I), 9,004 votes; Ane Halsboe-Jørgensen (A), 8,246 votes; and Lisbeth Bech Poulsen (F), 3,113 votes.

2007
Results of the 2007 general election held on 13 November 2007:

Votes per municipality:

The following candidates were elected:
 Constituency seats - Pernille Vigsø Bagge (F), 20,377 votes; Bent Bøgsted (O), 19,406 votes; Karl H. Bornhøft (F), 5,913 votes; Ole Vagn Christensen (A), 10,281 votes; Lene Espersen (C), 33,464 votes; Lene Hansen (A), 6,432 votes; Orla Hav (A), 44,848 votes; Birgitte Josefsen (V), 16,448 votes; Anita Knakkergaard (O), 8,152 votes; Karsten Lauritzen (V), 10,354 votes; Bjarne Laustsen (A), 23,757 votes; Tina Nedergaard (V), 18,685 votes; Jakob Axel Nielsen (C), 8,182 votes; Torsten Schack Pedersen (V), 13,583 votes; and Rasmus Prehn (A), 7,165 votes.
 Compensatory seats - Per Bisgaard (V), 8,737 votes; Marianne Jelved (B), 8,276 votes; Knud Kristensen (C), 3,906 votes; Flemming Møller Mortensen (A), 4,191 votes; and Ib Poulsen (O), 5,289 votes.

References

Folketing constituencies
Folketing constituencies established in 2007
Folketing constituency